The Peperbus Profspektakel is a cycling criterium held in Zwolle, the Netherlands. The course is held within closed roads of the city center. The first edition was held in 1999, and is held annually on the third Wednesday after the Tour de France. The ladies edition was first introduced in the year 2008.

List of winners

External links 
 

Men's road bicycle races
Cycle races in the Netherlands
Cycling in Overijssel
Sports competitions in Zwolle